Krzysztof Kosiński, also Kryshtof Kosynsky of Rawicz Coat of Arms (Kryshtof Kosynsky; ; 1545 – 1593) was a Cossack noble from the Podlachia region. He was a colonel of the Registered Cossacks and self-proclaimed Hetman of Ukraine. He led two consecutive rebellions against local Ruthenian nobility, known as the Kosiński Uprising.

His forces were first defeated by Duke Janusz Ostrogski in the Battle of Piątek on 2 February 1593. Kosiński promised to subject his forces to the Polish Monarchy; however, he soon escaped to Zaporizhia, where he began organizing a new army. In 1593 he set out for Cherkasy but was soon killed.

See also 
 Severyn Nalyvaiko

References

External links

 Kosynsky, Kryshtof in the Encyclopedia of Ukraine, vol. 2 (1989).

Polish Cossacks
1545 births
1593 deaths
Seniors of Registered Cossacks
Ruthenian nobility of the Polish–Lithuanian Commonwealth
Cossack rebels